Manya is a locality situated in the Sunraysia region and close to the border of South Australia.

The place name Manya is derived from the local Aboriginal word meaning "the hand".

Notes and references

Towns in Victoria (Australia)